The Gulf Group is a geologic group in Missouri. It preserves fossils dating back to the Cretaceous period.

See also

 List of fossiliferous stratigraphic units in Missouri
 Paleontology in Missouri

References
 

Geologic groups of Missouri
Cretaceous System of North America